Longview Park Conservatory and Gardens (39 acres) is a city park located at 1300 17th Street, Rock Island, Illinois. It is open daily without charge.

The park includes a conservatory, greenhouse, flower gardens, playground equipment, picnic shelters, volleyball pit, swimming pool, tennis courts, and walking paths. The park's disc golf course is considered one of the best in the Quad Cities.

See also
 List of botanical gardens in the United States

External links
 https://www.rigov.org/Facilities/Facility/Details/33 - official site
 https://www.rigov.org/84/Whitewater-Junction-Aquatic-Center - pool info

Botanical gardens in Illinois
Protected areas of Rock Island County, Illinois
Parks in Illinois
Tourist attractions in Rock Island, Illinois
Greenhouses in Illinois